is the Founder, President, CEO and Representative Director of Zuken Inc., a public listed multinational corporation in the Tokyo Stock Exchange. He also owns the exclusive golf club, The King Kamehameha Golf Club in Hawaii.

Makoto Kaneko is better known as a prominent horse owner in Japan. He is the owner of Deep Impact, one of the most famous racehorses in Japanese history. Kaneko has also become the first racehorse owner to win all of the 8 major races of Japan as well as the Japan Cup.

Makoto Kaneko's famous racehorses 
Black Hawk
He won the Sprinters Stakes and the Yasuda Kinen.
Kurofune
He has 4 course records. Because of his strength, He was called "White Secretariat".
To the Victory
She won the Queen Elizabeth II Commemorative Cup and challenged the Dubai World Cup twice. Her younger brother Silent Deal is also Makoto's horse.
Utopia
He was traded to Godolphin Racing.
King Kamehameha
He won the Tokyo Yushun (Japanese Derby) for the first time as Kaneko's horse.
Kane Hekili
He was also one of the strongest dirt-horses in Japan. He won 7 GI dirt-races.
Deep Impact
He won 7 GI races including the Japanese Triple Crown in 2005, and challenged the Prix de l'Arc de Triomphe held in 2006.
White Vessel
He was the first white horse in Japan Racing Association history to win a race. His father is Kurofune and mother is Shirayukihime who is also a white horse; White Vessel is a full brother of Yukichan.
Yukichan
She was the first white horse in Japan Racing Association history to win a graded race.
Apapane
She won the Japanese Fillies' Triple Crown in 2010.
Lovely Day
Winner of the 2015 Takarazuka Kinen and Tenno Sho (Autumn)
Makahiki
Winner of the 2016 Japanese Derby.
Wagnerian
Winner of the 2018 Japanese Derby.
Sodashi
The first white horse to win a grade 1 race.

References 

1945 births
Businesspeople from Tokyo
Japanese chief executives
Japanese racehorse owners and breeders
Living people
Waseda University alumni